Udit Alok Birla (born 17 November 1989) in Kolkata, West Bengal) is an Indian cricketer. He studied in The Bishop's School, Pune. He is primarily a right-handed middle order batsman.

He was picked to play for Pune Warriors India in the IPL 2013. He represents Madhya Pradesh in first class cricket.

References

External links
 

1989 births
Living people
Indian cricketers
Madhya Pradesh cricketers
Pune Warriors India cricketers
Central Zone cricketers
Cricketers from Kolkata
Cricketers from Pune